"Thank You" is a new jack swing song by American R&B/soul group Boyz II Men, released as the third single from their second studio album, II (1994). The song was co-produced by Dallas Austin and Boyz II Men. It did not perform as well as its predecessor and reached a peak position of #21 on the US Billboard Hot 100 and the Hot Singles Sales on March 18, 1995, and March 25, 1995, respectively, and also reached #17 on the US Billboard Hot R&B/Hip-Hop songs. "Thank You" performed moderately well in the UK eventually peaking at #26 on the UK Singles Chart. The song also peaked at #17 on the New Zealand RIANZ singles chart, #27 on the French singles chart and #33 on the Australian ARIA Singles Chart. The album version of the song is a cappella, consisting only of sounds created by the human voice, bringing to mind (and, at one time, quoting) one of their first hit songs, "Motownphilly".

Critical reception
Dave Sholin from the Gavin Report wrote, "Coming to the end of the road for ballads (at least until this track peaks), Motown's most successful and exciting act in decades turns up the heat. Slow jammin' or slammin' it, the Boyz's sound is hard to top."

Track listing

 single
"Thank You" (LP Version) – 4:34
"Thank You" (The Remix) – 6:29
"Thank You" (Summertime mix) – 4:59
"Thank You" (The Moog Flava mix) – 4:15
"Thank You" (Mercenary mix) – 5:16

 US maxi-CD
"Thank You" (The Moog Flava Mix) – 4:15
"Thank You" (Mercenary Mix) – 5:16
"Thank You" (LP Version) – 4:33
"Thank You" (The Remix) – 6:29
"Thank You" (Summertime Mix) – 4:59
"Fallin'" – 4:08

 US remix promo
"Thank You" (The Moog Flava Mix) – 4:15
"Thank You" (Untouchable Mix) – 5:48
"Thank You" (Mercenary Mix) – 5:16	
"Thank You" (LP Version) – 4:33
"Thank You" (The Remix) – 6:29
"Thank You" (Summertime Mix) – 4:59

 US vinyl, 12", promo
A1. "Thank You" (The Moog Flava Mix) – 4:15	
A2. "Thank You" (Untouchable Mix) – 5:48
A3. "Thank You" (Mercenary Mix) – 5:16
B1. "Thank You" (LP Version) – 4:33	
B2. "Thank You" (The Remix) – 6:29

 US vinyl, 12", promo
A1. "Thank You" (The Moog Flava Mix) – 4:15
A2. "Thank You" (Mercenary Mix) – 5:16 	
B1. "Thank You" (LP Version) – 4:33
B2. "Thank You" (The Remix) – 6:29
B3. "Thank You" (Summertime Mix) – 4:59

 UK maxi-CD
"Thank You" (The Moog Flava Mix)  	 	
"Thank You" (LP Version) 		
"Thank You" (The Remix) 		
"Motownphilly" (7" Radio Edit)

 UK vinyl, 12", promo
A1. "Thank You" (Untouchable Mix)
A2. "Thank You" (The Moog Flava Mix)
B1. "Thank You" (LP Version)
B2. "Thank You" (The Remix)
B3. "Thank You" (Summertime Mix)

 UK vinyl, 12"
A1. "Thank You" (The Remix)  	 	
A2. "Thank You" (The Moog Flava Mix) 		
B1. "Thank You" (LP Version) 		
B2. "Thank You" (Summertime Mix)

Charts

Weekly charts

Year-end charts

References

1995 singles
1995 songs
Boyz II Men songs
Song recordings produced by Dallas Austin
Motown singles